Darnell Robinson (born February 9, 1991) known professionally as Darnell Roy is an American rapper, record executive and record producer. He appeared in First Family of Hip Hop as the President of Sugar Hill Records.

Early life
Roy was born in Tenafly, New Jersey, United States. He is the grandson of Sylvia Robinson, founder of Sugarhill Records. In 2008, Darnell enrolled at SAE Institute in Atlanta, Georgia but dropped out to pursue music.

Career
Roy began recording songs as a child at the Sugarhill studio. In 2006 he was featured on  MTV's My Super Sweet 16. In March 2010, he produced his first record, "Drip," with Young Joc featuring Lil Wayne. Roy later collaborated with Young Money artists Lil Twist and Lil Chuckee. He went on to participate in the Scream Tour alongside Bow Wow, Omarion and Chris Brown. In 2016, he appeared in Bravo's docu-series First Family of Hip Hop. Following the debut of the show, he released the song, "NASA." In January 2017, his single "Not So Low Key Ft. Velous" was released and in June of the same year, he shared the track "Preserve" where he discusses his family's legacy in hip hop.

Filmography

Discography

References

Living people
1991 births
People from Teaneck, New Jersey
American male rappers
Record producers from New Jersey